K- or k- may refer to:
K-, insensitivity to the K spot test
, a negatively charged kaon
K-, a prefix meaning the Korean Wave such as K-pop, K-drama

See also
 ₭, the currency sign for the Lao kip